Adv. A. A. Rahim is a leader of the Communist Party of India (Marxist) and member of Rajya Sabha from Kerala. He is also serving as the All India president of the Democratic Youth Federation of India.

References

Rajya Sabha members from Kerala
Communist Party of India (Marxist) politicians from Kerala
Living people
Year of birth missing (living people)